Passion flower most commonly refers to Passiflora, a genus of flowering plants.

Passion Flower may also refer to:
Dolores Ibárruri, known as "La Pasionaria" (English: "the Passionflower") 
The Passion Flower (1912 film), a short starring Laura Sawyer
Heart of Juanita, also known as The Passion Flower, a 1919 film starring Beatriz Michelena
The Passion Flower, a 1921 film featuring Norma Talmadge
Passion Flower (1930 film), starring Kay Francis
Passionflower (1952 film)
Passionflower (2011 film), a Canadian film from 2011
"The Passion Flower", a song by Irving Berlin
Passion Flower, a novel by Kathleen Norris and the basis of the 1930 film
Passion Flowers, a book by Annah Robinson Watson
"Passion Flower", a 1971 song by the rock band Stoneground